Shiur (lit. amount, pl. shiurim  ) is a lecture on any Torah topic, such as Gemara, Mishnah, Halakha (Jewish law), Tanakh (Bible), etc.

History 

The Hebrew term שיעור ("designated amount") came to refer to a portion of Judaic text arranged for study on a particular occasion, such as a yartzeit, the dedication of a new home, or the evening of a holiday, and then to a public reading and explanation of the same. The act of teaching and studying these texts at the designated time was known in Yiddish as schiur lernen. These shiurim would be attended by all classes of people; it was traditional for learned attendees to engage the lecturer in continuous discussion, and for the larger lay audience to listen intently.

Concurrently, the word came to refer to the daily study quotient for students of a yeshiva, and then to the lecture given thereon. Akiva Eger, for example,would not miss learning a single shiur with the yeshiva. His shiurim with them were always three per day: there was a session of Talmud and Tosafot, a session of exhaustive Halakha, and a session of Shulchan Aruch and Magen Avraham, and these were aside from the session of Tur and SA Yoreh De'ah he would learn with his children and some students, and with these he would learn a further shiur of exhaustive Talmud and Tosafot at night.

Yeshiva learning

"Shiur" will typically refer to the type of learning that takes place in yeshivot and kollelim, where students hear an in-depth lecture on the sugya (Gemara topic) they are studying at the time.

Typically, yeshiva students attend a daily shiur yomi (daily lecture) given by a maggid shiur (literally, "sayer of the shiur") and a weekly shiur klali (comprehensive lecture, which sums up the week's learning) given by the rosh yeshiva. The rosh yeshiva usually also gives the senior shiur - see below - on a daily basis. 

Before the shiur, a bibliography and a series of textual references, or mar'e mekomot,

  
are posted so that students may prepare for the lecture in advance. Students typically spend several hours preparing for the shiur yomi. After the shiur, students spend additional time reviewing and clarifying the lesson that they have just heard. These preparation and review periods take place in a special time period called a seder, in which students study the lesson individually and/or in chavrutot (study pairs).

Shiurim may also be offered in yeshiva on topics in mussar, Chumash, and hashkafah (Jewish philosophy), depending on the yeshiva and the learning level of its students.
The shiur is likewise the typical format for classes at women's seminaries and midrashot.

Class levels
For Talmud-study, the level of complexity and understanding expected from students increases each year, successively incorporating additional layers of commentary and perspectives, and with  the analysis compounding correspondingly;
see . 

Thus, following on from the practice of the Telz Yeshiva, studies are typically organized by level. 
The term "shiur" is then used to differentiate different classes, so that first-year students are typically said to be in "Shiur Aleph"; second-year students in "Shiur Bet"; and third-year students in "Shiur Gimmel", etc. 
Strong students may be "promoted", but it is less common for a student to be held back.

Commonly the fourth Shiur is that of the Rosh Yeshiva, head of the institution. Here students consolidate the approach to study, or "derech ha-limud",  emphasized by their yeshiva. 
See .

In kollelim ("post-graduate" institutions), the shiurim address a yet more advanced level of study, with students learning independently, although under guidance of the rosh kollel;
Rabbinic ordination, Semicha, programs similarly require that students have attained a high level in Talmud, this being the base for their advanced study of Halacha.
Typically, then, before joining a kollel or pursuing ordination, students are required to have learned in the "Rosh Yeshiva's Shiur" for at least two years.

Related structures
Some Orthodox yeshivot - such as Ner Yisroel and Kollel Etz Chaim - organize learning (at senior levels)  in "chaburahs". Here, the members of the chaburah all focus on the same specific area or work of Torah study, informally lead by the rosh-chaburah. 

A (more structured) study group in a Yeshiva is sometimes referred to as a "Kibbutz" - see for example  -  especially in older usage, preceding the use of that term for an agricultural community.

Public study sessions
Synagogue rabbis and noted rabbis also give shiurim to their communities. 
In shuls, the shiur given between the Mincha and Maariv services is usually geared to baalebatim (laymen). 
Noted rabbis give more in-depth shiurim to attendees on Shabbat or weekday evenings, usually in the local synagogue or beth midrash (study hall).

(Public) shiurim range in length and depth: 
from a short "vort", or  "Dvar Torah" ("word (of Torah)", in Yiddish and Hebrew respectively), to a detailed "drasha" ("study", from the Aramaic; see midrash); 
the former above, baalebatim focused, is  a vort, while the latter is a drosha.
Especially in Chasidic settings, a less formal - often inspirational - shiur may be termed "sicha" (שיחה, lit. "speech"); see also Maamor and Maamarim (Chabad).

Commonly, the Rosh Yeshiva delivers a weekly shiur on the parashah (weekly Torah portion), exploring a particular question or theme. This is usually in-depth, of an hour in duration, and typically open to the public.

Many yeshivot, midrashot, and "community kollels" host yemei iyun ("days of in-depth learning", sing. yom iyun), where community members study a specific topic. These are often held before religious holidays - especially Pesach and the New Year period - preparing the spiritual and halakhik elements of the upcoming festival.

A "Memorial Shiur" is often given to the entire yeshiva / community on the Yahrzeit of a (founding) Rosh Yeshiva or Rabbi; usually exploring a specific topic of general interest.

"Shiur" may include any kind of Torah lesson — including lectures to children, women, and baalebatim (lay audience), and taped lectures circulated via cassette tape, computer, MP3 or MP4 file, or call-in telephone lines. Some kiruv organizations advertise "five-minute shiurim" to attract new listeners.

Similarly, "Vort" and "Dvar Torah", may refer to any short Torah idea, (often linked to that week’s parsha ) delivered on various occasions,
 
 
and not necessarily by a Rabbi; 
for example: by the host at their Shabbat table, by the leader before "Benching" (grace after meals), or by a guest at sheva brachot, or any Seudat mitzvah.

References

External links
"How to Review Shiur: A Practical Guide"
"Video Shiurim"

Torah
Orthodox yeshivas
Hebrew words and phrases
Jewish education